The highland tinamou or Bonaparte's tinamou (Nothocercus bonapartei) is a type of ground bird found in montane moist forest typically over  altitude.

Taxonomy
All tinamou are from the family Tinamidae, and in the larger scheme are also ratites.  Unlike other ratites, tinamous can fly, although in general, they are not strong fliers.  All ratites evolved from prehistoric flying birds, and tinamous are the closest living relative of these birds.

It has five subspecies:
 N. b. frantzii occurs in the highlands of Costa Rica and western Panama.
 N. b. bonapartei occurs in northwestern Venezuela and northern Colombia.
 N. b. discrepans occurs in central Colombia (Tolima and Meta provinces).
 N. b. intercedens occurs in the western Andes of Colombia.
 N. b. plumbeiceps occurs in the Andes of eastern Ecuador and far northern Peru.

George Robert Gray identified the highland tinamou from a specimen from Aragua, Venezuela, in 1867.

Etymology
The specific name bonapartei, a Latin genitive of the name Bonaparte, commemorates Charles Lucien Bonaparte.

Description
Its plumage is mottled or barred with black and cinnamon on back and wings with a rufous throat.

Behavior
The highland tinamou is a shy tinamou and usually solitary or in small groups of up to five. It likes to eat fruit from the ground or hanging from low plants, and will sometimes eat insects. Its call is a repetitive loud and hollow call by the male.

During breeding season, the male will incubate the eggs which may be from more than one female and may consist of 4-12 eggs.  After hatching the male will also take care of the chicks.

Range
This tinamou is located in the Andes of Colombia, eastern Ecuador, northern Peru, western Venezuela, and the highlands of Costa Rica and western Panama.

Habitat
The highland tinamou frequents montane forest above , liking damp areas, especially bamboo thickets, and ravines.

Conservation
This species is listed by the IUCN as Least Concern, and even though it is hunted for food, its population seems to be stable.

Footnotes

References
 
 
 
 
 

highland tinamou
Birds of Costa Rica
highland tinamou
Birds of the Colombian Andes
Birds of the Ecuadorian Andes
Birds of the Venezuelan Andes
highland tinamou
highland tinamou